21st meridian may refer to:

21st meridian east, a line of longitude east of the Greenwich Meridian
21st meridian west, a line of longitude west of the Greenwich Meridian